The New York Ripper is a 1982 Italian giallo film directed by Lucio Fulci. The film is about a police lieutenant who is tracking a sadistic killer who slashes women with a switchblade and straight-razors because his daughter in the hospital will never grow up to be beautiful.

The film was shot in late August to October 1981 in New York with interiors being shot in Italy. The script was re-written by Dardano Sacchetti at the last moment before filming had begun. It was released in 1982 in Italy and later in the United States in 1984 while being banned in the United Kingdom until 2002.

Plot 
A decomposed human hand is found in New York City. The police identify it as belonging to Anne Lynne, a local model. Lieutenant Fred Williams (Jack Hedley), the burned-out police detective investigating the murder, interviews the young woman's nosy landlady, Mrs. Weissburger (Babette New). She tells him that during her daily spying and eavesdropping on her tenants, she overheard the girl last week over the phone arranging to meet a man who spoke with a strange, duck-like voice.

On a ferry, a young woman (Cinzia de Ponti) is eviscerated as she attempts to vandalize a car. The pathologist who conducts the autopsy (Giordano Falzoni) tells Williams that the style of the murder was similar to that of Anne Lynne and a similar case in Harlem the previous month. When Williams tells the press about a potential serial killer on the loose, the chief of police (Lucio Fulci) orders him not to make any further public announcements about the case to avoid starting a citywide panic. Williams hires Dr. Paul Davis (Paolo Malco) to advise on the case.

That night in New York's red-light district, Jane Lodge (Alexandra Delli Colli) attends a live sex show and records the simulated moans and groans of the two performers with a pocket tape recorder. Mickey Scellenda (Howard Ross), a scruffy, dangerous-looking man with two fingers missing from his right hand, sits nearby and observes what she is doing. After the show has ended, the female performer (Zora Kerova) is brutally killed by the maniac, stabbing her in the groin with a broken bottle. Later that night, while at the apartment of Kitty (Daniela Doria), a prostitute he patronizes, Williams receives a taunting phone call from the duck-voiced killer saying that he has killed again.

A young woman, Fay (Almanta Suska), is attacked by a handsome, razor-blade-wielding killer but survives. She is comforted in the hospital by her handsome boyfriend, Peter (Andrea Occhipinti). Fay tells Williams that she suspects her attacker was a scruffy, dangerous-looking man missing two fingers from his right hand. Jane continues to prowl New York for sexual experiences. After being molested in a pool hall, she picks up Scellenda; they go to a sleazy hotel room and engage in BDSM. As he has a post-coital nap, Jane overhears a radio DJ describing the killer, whom the press has now dubbed 'the New York Ripper,' as missing two fingers from his right hand. Jane slips from the room only to be killed by the New York Ripper.

Williams identifies Scellenda as the eight-fingered man — a Greek immigrant with a history of sexual assault and drug abuse. Although Dr. Davis doubts that Scellenda is intelligent enough to be the serial killer, his concerns seem obviated when Scellenda attempts to kill Fay in her home before being chased off by her boyfriend. A week later, Williams receives a call from the Ripper who wants to "dedicate a murder" to him. After being delayed by a false lead, Williams realizes the Ripper's target is Kitty. But he arrives too late to prevent her gruesome murder.

Scellenda's body is found a few days later; he has committed suicide. The pathologist tells Williams he was dead several days before Kitty's murder, proving he couldn't be the Ripper. Dr. Davis completes a profile of the killer: an intelligent young man who hates young, sexually active women and followed Scellenda to identify his victims. Realizing this describes Peter, Williams and Davis begin to follow him and Fay. They discover that Peter has Suzy, a terminally ill daughter from a previous relationship. Believing them to be the killers, Williams goes to their house to arrest them. There he discovers Peter attempting to kill Fay and kills him.

Davis explains to Fay that Peter resented her and other women for enjoying a life that his daughter never would. Suzy attempts to call Peter on the phone from her hospital room but receives no reply.

Cast 
Jack Hedley as Lt. Fred Williams
Paolo Malco as Dr. Paul Davis
Almanta Suska as Fay Majors (credited as Almanta Keller)
Howard Ross as Mickey Scellenda (Mikis)
Andrea Occhipinti as Peter Bunch (credited as Andrew Painter)
Alexandra Delli Colli as Jane Lodge
Cosimo Cinieri as Dr. Lodge (credited as Laurence Welles)
Giordano Falzoni as Dr. Barry Jones, Coroner
Daniela Doria as Kitty
Cinzia de Ponti as Rosie - Ferry victim
Zora Kerova as Eva - Sex show performer (credited as Zora Kerowa)
Josh Cruze as Chico (credited as Johs Cruze)
Antone Pagán as Morales (credited as Anthon Kagan)
Chiara Ferrari as Susy Bunch
Barbara Cupisti as Heather
Babette New as Mrs. Weissburger

Production
Producer Fabrizio De Angelis was not content with the script provided by Gianfranco Clerici and Vincenzo Mannino and had Dardano Sacchetti rewrite the script. According to Sacchetti, De Angelis claimed the film to be modelled after The Hunger (1983) , which is impossible as the film came out after Fulci's film was completed. Sacchetti stated that the film had initially involved a murderer suffering from progeria, that it was "a medication on old age and human decadence. Fulci didn't understand it." and that Sacchetti had to re-do "the script in five days, not working on the structure or plot but on the situations, that is, the death scenes and the giallo mechanisms." Sacchetti added that much of the film's sexual content came from Fulci, claiming that Fulci "nurtures a profound sadism towards women."  Prior to the release of the film, Fulci discussed the production, describing it as "much less horror than my previous films, no zombies, but a human killer working in the dark." Fulci described the film as a tribute to Alfred Hitchcock, billing it as "Hitchcock Revisited, a fantastic film with a plot, violence and sexuality." 

The New York Ripper was shot in eight weeks from late August to October 1981 under the working title of Lo squartatore. It was shot on location in New York with interiors filmed in Rome.
Among the cast was Jack Hedley, who was cast after filming had commenced. Zora Kerova, who played Eva in the film, spoke positively about working with Fulci and stated that it took a while for Fulci to warm up to her. When asked what she thought of the film, she stated she "didn't like The New York Ripper at all."

Release
The New York Ripper was released on 4 March 1982 in Italy. It grossed 1,039,731,282 Italian lira during its original theatrical run, and found similar commercial success abroad.

In the United Kingdom, the film was screened for the BBFC, with Carol Tpolski describing the film as "simply the most damaging film I have ever seen in my whole life" and "a relentless catalogue of the eponymous antihero/villain cutting women up." The film was banned in the United Kingdom, where it could not be sold or owned until 2002.

The film received a limited theatrical release in the United States in 1984 and was released on VHS in 1987, where it was slightly edited by Vidmark Entertainment. It has been released by Blue Underground on Blu-ray and DVD in 2016. It received a 4K scan Blu-ray Release in 2019 and finally a Special Edition 4k Release in August 2020.

Critical reception 
From reviews in the 1980s, critic Alan Jones stated in a 1983 issue of Starburst that the film was a "psychotic, erotic masterpiece" and "the strongest and most powerful of all [of Fulci's] films to date." concluding that the film "clinches his position as one of the most influential directors of the past decade." Jones continued that the film captured the sleaziness of New York to perfection, Fulci's sense of ironic humor, declaring the only faults were that the passage of time within sections of the film is unclear; and that the motive for the murders was "a trifle thin". In an overview of Fulci's career in 1989,  Chas. Balun wrote in GoreZone that The New York Ripper was "justifiably overlooked" stating that "one can almost summarily dismiss the clunky plotting, regressive world view, mean-spirited misogyny and sleazy sexual sadism, but no one can let Fulci off the hook for featuring a psychopathic killer who quacks like a duck!"

Eric Henderson of Slant Magazine called the film "sour and pointless," adding that it "utilizes all the necessary ingredients but fails to summon from them the magisterial dignity one expects from the finer NYC vomitoriums." On his website, Fantastic Movie Musings and Ramblings, Dave Sindelar criticized the film's clichéd plot, obvious identity of the killer and attempts at pathos, the latter of which he felt were "forced and ineffectual." In the end, Sindelar stated that the film's nastiness and gore were its primary appeal, while also noting that it "will certainly not be to everyone’s taste." Maitland McDonagh from TV Guide gave the film 1/4 stars, writing, "Fulci alternates sleazy sex scenes with graphic and deeply misogynistic murders, fills the plots with twists that make no sense, then wraps the whole thing up in a preposterous psychological flourish."
Robert Firsching of AllMovie claimed that the film was Fulci "pandering to the lowest common denominator as never before in his career". He added that "Fulci showed with this blatant play for the sicko slasher crowd that the days of well-plotted, stylish Italian horror were gone, replaced with the most vicious sort of sexual violence and perversion", concluding that the film was a "shameful piece of work".

References

Citations

Sources

External links 
 
 
 

1982 thriller films

Italian serial killer films
Films directed by Lucio Fulci
Films scored by Francesco De Masi
Italian slasher films 
1980s Italian-language films
Giallo films 
Films set in New York City
Films shot in New York City
Italian horror films
Italian exploitation films
Italian splatter films
Films about stalking
Films about violence against women
1980s Italian films